Shake, Rattle & Roll (SRR) is a Filipino horror anthology film series produced by Regal Entertainment, and formerly Athena Productions. It is the longest-running film series in the Philippines, as it dates back from 1984 to 2014. All films of the series were official entries for the Metro Manila Film Festival, with the exception of the sixth installment, which premiered in January 1997. The title is solely based on the song of the same name.

The first installment was released under the defunct Athena Productions, while all the succeeding installments are produced by Regal Entertainment.

, there are fifteen installments of the film series, with the last installment released on December 25, 2014, at the 40th Metro Manila Film Festival, as one of the eight official entries of the event.

Films

Television release
Episodes of the Shake, Rattle & Roll films were aired in ABS-CBN, as part of the channel's SRR Sabado Special block every Saturday.

Themes
Subjects and themes used in Shake, Rattle & Roll include Filipino supernatural beings, superstitions, urban legends, extraterrestrials, cults and demonic possessions. While films of the series usually premiere in Christmas season, only the "Christmas Tree" episode of Shake, Rattle and Roll 9 had Christmas-related content.

References

Regal Entertainment films
Horror film series
 
Philippine horror films
Anthology film series